This is a family tree of the monarchs of the Kingdom of Aragon.

The colors denote the monarchs from the:
 - House of Jiménez;  - House of Barcelona;  - House of Trastámara

——  The solid lines denote the legitimate descents

– – – - The dashed lines denote a marriage

· · · · The dotted lines denote the liaisons and illegitimate descents

Aragon, Monarchs of
 Family tree